Talking Tom & Friends (known as Talking Friends until late 2014, and Talking Tom and Friends until early 2021) is a video game franchise created and owned by Outfit7 Limited, a Slovenian video game developer. The franchise focuses on various mobile games involving anthropomorphic animal characters repeating things said by the user. The first game, Talking Tom Cat, was launched in July 2010. As of June 2022, the apps have achieved more than 18 billion downloads. The franchise also includes various web series, which are mostly posted on YouTube.

Characters

Current
 Talking Tom (also called Tom) – A grey tabby cat and the title character of the franchise. Tom is a wisecracking, adventure-seeking cat, described as the "world's most popular cat". In his app, he is a fully animated interactive 3D character that users can tickle, poke and play with. Users can also get Tom to repeat what they say, but said in a higher pitch voice. The original Talking Tom Cat app was launched in July 2010 for iOS, followed by Talking Tom 2 in 2011. In 2013, the My Talking Tom app was released, followed by the My Talking Tom 2 app in 2018.
 Talking Angela (also called Angela) – Tom's girlfriend, a white cat with a love for travel, singing, fashion and dancing. Angela has also appeared in other apps in Outfit7's flagship entertainment franchise, the more popular ones being Tom's Love Letters, Tom Loves Angela, Talking Tom Gold Run, and Talking Tom Hero Dash.
 Talking Ginger (also called Ginger) – A mischievous ginger tabby kitten. In the Talking Friends web series, he is Tom's nephew. In the Talking Tom and Friends web series, he is Tom's neighbour.
 Talking Ben (also called Ben) – A brown dog and Tom's best friend who is described in the Talking Ben app as "a grumpy dog and a chemistry professor". He enjoys inventing and doing things involving science and technology.
 Talking Hank (also called Hank) – A white dog with blue spots (one on his right eye, one on his tail tip, and the other on his rear). He was introduced in December 2014 with the premiere of the Talking Tom and Friends web series. His hobby is watching sitcoms, and he is Tom's roommate.
 Talking Becca (also called Becca) – A grey rabbit who was introduced in the Talking Tom and Friends web series. Like Angela, she is also an aspiring singer.
 Talking Gina – A giraffe who was only featured in the Talking Gina app and the Talking Friends web series.
 Talking Pierre – A parrot who was only featured in the Talking Pierre app and the Talking Friends web series.
 Talking Larry – A bird who was featured in a few apps including Talking Larry.

Games

Talking Tom 
Talking Tom (officially named as Talking Tom Cat) is a video game released in 2010 by Outfit7, in which the title character, Tom, repeats anything said to him in a high-pitched voice, and interacts with the user.

Talking Gina 
Talking Gina was an app released in 2011 featuring a giraffe named Gina, which interacts with the user. As of June 2022, the app is no longer available. The title character was featured in the Talking Friends web series, but has since not made any appearances.

Talking Ben 
Talking Ben (officially named as Talking Ben the Dog) is an app released in 2011 in which the user interacts with Ben. The character has been featured in numerous apps, and in every web series excluding Talking Tom Shorts.

Talking Tom 2 
Talking Tom 2 (officially named as Talking Tom Cat 2) is the sequel to Talking Tom, released in 2011. It retains most of the features of its predecessor, adding its own features and improved graphics.

Talking News 
Talking News (officially named as Talking Tom and Ben News) is a game released in 2011, in which Talking Tom and Talking Ben act as TV news anchors, repeating whatever is recorded and pulling pranks on each other.

Talking Pierre 
Talking Pierre is a video-game released in 2011 in which the user interacts with a parrot named Pierre. Pierre has appeared in only one web series since being introduced — Talking Friends.

Tom's Love Letters 
Tom's Love Letters is an app released in 2012 that lets users send personalised messages to their friends and family. As of June 2022, the app is no longer available.

Tom Loves Angela 
Tom Loves Angela is an app released in 2012 that lets users watch Tom courting Angela. As of June 2022, the app is no longer available.

Talking Ginger 
Talking Ginger is an app released in 2012 that lets the user interact with an orange kitten named Ginger and get him ready for bed. The character has been featured in numerous apps, and in every web series excluding Talking Tom Shorts.

Talking Angela 

Talking Angela is an app released in 2012 that was the target of a mudslinging campaign in which various individuals alleged that the app was created by paedophiles with the intent of tracking children, though no legitimate evidence was found proving the claims.

Talking Ginger 2 
Talking Ginger 2 (formerly Ginger’s Birthday) is a game released in 2013, featuring Ginger. It allows the user to interact with Ginger at his birthday party. Until April 2014, the app was known as Ginger's Birthday.

My Talking Tom 

My Talking Tom is a virtual pet app released on November 14, 2013, that allows the user to take care of Tom as he grows, and rename and customise him.

My Talking Angela 
My Talking Angela is a virtual pet app released in 2014 that allows the user to take care of Angela as she grows, and rename and customise her.

Talking Tom Jetski 
Talking Tom Jetski is a game released in 2015 in which the user either plays as Tom or Angela, riding on a jet ski to complete missions. As of June 2022, the app is no longer available.

Talking Tom Bubble Shooter 
Talking Tom Bubble Shooter is a bubble-shooting game released in 2015. As of June 2022, the app is no longer available.

Talking Tom Gold Run 
Talking Tom Gold Run is an endless runner game released in 2016, in which the player, as Tom, Angela, Ben, Hank or Ginger, chases a robber while collecting gold bars.

My Talking Hank 
My Talking Hank is a virtual pet game released in 2016, in which the user takes care of Hank.

Talking Angela Color Splash 
Talking Angela Color Splash is a match-3 game released in 2017. As of June 2022, the app is no longer available.

Talking Tom Camp 
Talking Tom Camp is a strategy game released in 2017, in which the player builds a camp while attacking enemy camps. As of June 2022, the app is no longer available.

Talking Tom Pool 
Talking Tom Pool is a game released in 2017 in which the player builds a waterpark. As of June 2022, the app is no longer available.

Talking Tom Jetski 2 
Talking Tom Jetski 2 is a jetski racing video-game released in 2018. It has different rules from Talking Tom Jetski.

Talking Tom Candy Run 
Talking Tom Candy Run is an endless runner game released in 2018.

Talking Tom Cake Jump 
Talking Tom Cake Jump is an endless jumper game released in 2018. As of June 2022, the app is no longer available.

Talking Tom Jump Up 
Talking Tom Jump Up is another endless jumper game released in 2018. As of June 2022, the app is no longer available.

My Talking Tom 2 
My Talking Tom 2 is a virtual pet app released in 2018. It is a sequel to My Talking Tom.

Talking Tom Fun Fair 
Talking Tom Fun Fair is a match-3 game released in 2019 in which the player rebuilds an abandoned amusement park. As of June 2022, the app is no longer available.

Talking Tom Hero Dash 
Talking Tom Hero Dash is an endless runner game released in 2019 that is similar to Talking Tom Gold Run. The characters are superheroes.

Talking Tom Splash Force 
Talking Tom Splash Force is a game in which the player uses water balloons to attack criminals.

My Talking Tom Friends 
My Talking Tom Friends is a game where the player takes care of Tom initially, but later gets Angela, Hank, Ginger, Ben and Becca to take care of too.

My Talking Angela 2 
My Talking Angela 2 is a virtual pet app released in 2021. It is a sequel to My Talking Angela.

Talking Tom Time Rush 
Talking Tom Time Rush is an endless runner game released in 2021.  As of June 2022, the game is only available in limited countries.

Talking Tom Blast Park 

Talking Tom Blast Park is a shooter game released in 2023 as the player shoots Roy once with Tom, Angela, Hank, Tom's new pet Squeak, Ben, Becca and Ginger. when the player installs this game, the game says that half of the characters (Angela, Hank, Squeak, Becca, Ben and Ginger) is coming soon when you win and then it will unlock the characters.

Web series

Talking Friends

Talking Friends was the first animated web series of the Talking Tom and Friends franchise. It was produced by Disney Interactive Studios, and ran on YouTube from June 8 to August 31, 2012, for 10 episodes.

Talking Tom and Friends

Outfit7 Limited launched an animated series called Talking Tom and Friends in December 2014, later renamed Talking Tom & Friends, based on the antics of Talking Tom and his friends. The show's first 3 seasons were produced by the Austrian animation studio ARX Anima, while the Spanish animation studio People Moving Pixels produced season 4 and season 5.

Talking Tom Shorts
Talking Tom Shorts is an ongoing web series. The show revolves the lives of Tom, Ben, Angela, Ginger and Hank, and it  features another character referred to as the hand. Unlike the TV series, none of the characters have dialogue, and the show extensively uses slapstick comedy. It is currently available on YouTube.

Season 1 (2014–18)

Season 2 (2019-TBA)

Talking Tom and Friends Minis
Talking Tom and Friends Minis is a 2D animated web series featuring Talking Tom and his friends. The characters are presented without any particular language dialogue. It is developed and produced by Outfit7 and Plenus. The show was released from March 2016 to July 2018.

Talking Tom Heroes

Talking Tom Heroes is an animated series by Outfit7. It premiered on April 26, 2019, on YouTube. It also premiered on Boomerang in Asia and on Pop in the United Kingdom.

Talking Tom Heroes: Suddenly Super
Talking Tom Heroes: Suddenly Super is an upcoming animated series by Outfit7 and Epic Story Media, a company that has worked on other TV shows such as Slugterra and Pocoyo, announced on July 9, 2021. It will follow the characters as they work as superheroes while maintaining a civilian identity.

Other media 
The Talking Tom & Friends franchise has expanded beyond apps and animated series. The franchise also sells branded merchandise and music videos.

Talking Tom and Talking Angela's music video for their single "You Get Me", created in cooperation with Walt Disney Records, has received over 350 million views on YouTube as of March 2020. Talking Angela has also recorded her first solo song called "That's Falling in Love". Talking Tom and Talking Angela's "Stand By Me", based on Ben E. King's song of the same name, received 54 million views as of March 2021.

Talking Tom & Friends launched a range of interactive toys called "Superstar" in 2012. The plush toys talk and interact with multiple Talking Tom & Friends apps, as well as with each other, using a voice recognition system. The series has since been discontinued.

A live-action animated feature film based on the Talking Tom & Friends franchise entered development in October 2014, with Brad Fischer, James Vanderbilt, and William Sherak producing the film. It will be produced by Mythology Entertainment. In October 2018, Jean-Julien Baronnet (who was also involved in the Rabbids Invasion television series and the Assassin's Creed film) was set to produce the film. As of late October 2019, the film is stated to be in the script stage, but they are still figuring out on what it will look like and what the story should be like.

Controversies

Paedophile hoax
In February 2014, Talking Angela was the subject of an Internet hoax claiming that it encourages children to disclose personal information about themselves, which is allegedly then used by paedophiles to identify the location of these children. The rumor, which was widely circulated on Facebook and various websites claiming to be dedicated to parenting, claims that Angela, the game's main character, asks the game's user for private personal information using the game's text-chat feature. Other versions of the rumor even claim that it is run by a paedophile ring, while some go so far as to even claim that the user is recorded by the camera and can be seen in Angela's eyes.

It was debunked by Snopes.com soon afterwards. The site's owners, Barbara and David Mikkelson, reported that they had tried to "prompt" it to give responses asking for private information but were unsuccessful, even when asking it explicitly sexual questions. While it is true that in the game with child mode off Angela does ask for the user's name, age and personal preferences to determine conversation topics, Outfit7 has said that this information is all "anonymised" and all personal information is removed from it. It is also impossible for a person to take control of what Angela says in the game, since the app is based on chat bot software.

In 2015, the hoax was revived again on Facebook, prompting online security company Sophos and The Guardian to debunk it again. Sophos employee Paul Ducklin wrote on the company's blog that the message being posted on Facebook promoting the hoax was "close to 600 rambling, repetitious words, despite claiming at the start that it didn't have words to describe the situation. It's ill-written, and borders on being illiterate and incomprehensible." Bruce Wilcox, one of the game's programmers, has attributed the hoax's popularity to the fact that the chatbot program in Talking Angela is so realistic.

However, genuine concern has been raised that the game's child mode may be too easy for children to turn off, which, if they did, would allow them to purchase "coins", which can be used as currency in the game, via iTunes. Disabling child mode also enables the chat feature, which, while not "connecting your children to pedophiles", still raises concerns as well, according to Stuart Dredge, a journalist from The Guardian. Dredge wrote that in chat mode, Angela asks for information such as the user's name.

Impact
The scare has significantly boosted the game's popularity, and is credited with helping the app make it into the top 10 free iPhone apps soon after the hoax became widely known in February 2014 and 3rd most popular for all iPhone apps at the start of the following month.

Age-inappropriate advertising 
In 2015, the My Talking Tom app was reported for having advertised age-inappropriate advertisements for adult services. The Advertising Standards Authority of the United Kingdom ruled that advertising for an adult web site was delivered to underage children via the app. The ASA noted that Outfit7 "had a strict advertising policy" but that the company "had not been able to identify which ad network had served an age-inappropriate ad on a children's app" and how the advertisements were shown in the app.

Reception
My Talking Tom had over 11 million downloads and was the top games app in 135 countries worldwide within 10 days of its launch.

The Talking Tom & Friends YouTube channel has over 14.8 million subscribers and 6.1 billion views as of May 2022.

As of June 2022, the franchise has had its apps downloaded more than 18 billion times.

Accolades
The My Talking Tom app won the award for "Best iPad Game: Kids, Education & Family" at the 2014 Tabby Awards, the global competition for the best tablet app.

My Talking Tom was also voted the 2014 Tabby Award Users' Choice favorite in two categories, "Best iPad Game: Kids, Education & Family" and "Best Android Game: Puzzle, Cards & Family".

The Talking Tom & Friends television series won the Best Animated Series Award at the 2016 Cablefax Awards.

Footnotes

See also 
 Digital puppetry
 List of most downloaded Android applications

References

External links
 

2010 video games
 
Android (operating system) games
IOS games
Video games adapted into television shows
Video game franchises introduced in 2010
Mass media franchises
Video games about cats
Video games developed in Slovenia
Virtual pet video games